Still Grazing: The Musical Journey of Hugh Masekela is an autobiography book by South African trumpeter Hugh Masekela. It was released on May 11, 2004 by Crown Archetype. The book was written together with D. Michael Cheers. In this book, Masekela tells a story of his forty-year career in the world of African jazz and his travels from South Africa to New York, then to Jamaica, and then back to his homeland. The book is complemented by the album of the same name.

Review

—Publishers Weekly

See also
To Be or Not to Bop: Memoirs of Dizzy Gillespie

References

External links
Profile on Google Books
 
2004 non-fiction books
Autobiographies
Music autobiographies